Baba Oulen Souare (born 7 March 1999) is a Swiss footballer who currently plays as a defender for Swiss side Servette.

Club career

Early years
Born in Genève, Switzerland, Souare started his career in the youth sector at Servette.

Servette
Souare began his senior career in Switzerland with Servette.

Grasshoppers
He transferred to Grasshopper Club Zurich on 29 March 2019.

Loan to Kriens
Souare was loaned to Kriens for 1 year by Grasshopper Club Zürich on 24 August 2020.

Servette
Souare signed a 3-year contract with Servette on 20 July 2022.

International career
Born in Switzerland, Souare is of Senegalese descent. He has been capped at youth level for Switzerland.

Career statistics

References

External links
 
 Baba Souare at SFL
 FDB Profile
 Baba Souare at Servette FC

1999 births
Living people
Footballers from Geneva
Swiss men's footballers
Switzerland youth international footballers
Swiss people of Senegalese descent
Swiss Super League players
Swiss Challenge League players
Servette FC players
Grasshopper Club Zürich players
SC Kriens players